Robert Altman is an American film director, producer, and screenwriter.

He is known for such films as the war comedy M*A*S*H (1970), the revisionist western McCabe & Mrs. Miller (1971), the neo-noir The Long Goodbye (1973), the dramedy film California Split (1974), the satirical musical film Nashville (1975), the drama 3 Women (1977), the comedy A Wedding (1978), the musical comedy Popeye (1980), the drama Secret Honor (1984), the black comedy The Player (1992), the ensemble film Short Cuts (1993), the British murder mystery film Gosford Park (2001), and A Prairie Home Companion (2006).

Altman received various awards and nominations including seven Academy Award nominations winning the Honorary Oscar in 2006. He received seven British Academy Film Award nominations winning twice for The Player (1992), and Gosford Park (2001). He received the Primetime Emmy Award for Outstanding Directing for a Drama Series for Tanner '88 (1988). He also received five Golden Globe Award nominations winning the Golden Globe Award for Best Director for Gosford Park. He also received various awards from film festivals including the Cannes Film Festival's prestigious Palme d'Or for M*A*S*H and the Cannes Film Festival Award for Best Director for The Player. He has also received the Berlin International Film Festival's Golden Bear, and the Venice Film Festival's Golden Lion. In 1994, he received the Directors Guild of America Lifetime Achievement Award.

Major associations

Academy Awards

British Academy Film Awards

Primetime Emmy Awards

Golden Globe Awards

Festival awards

Cannes Film Festival

Berlin International Film Festival

Venice Film Festival

Industry awards

Independent Spirit Awards

Directors Guild of America Award

Writers Guild of America Award

References 

Altman, Robert